Krasilnikoviella muralis is a Gram-positive and facultatively anaerobic  bacterium from the genus Krasilnikoviella.

References 

Micrococcales
Bacteria described in 2017